The Ainsworth House in Thompson Falls in Sanders County, Montana was built in 1910.  It was listed on the National Register of Historic Places in 1986.  It has also been known as Fisher House.

It is a one-and-a-half-story "bungalow-inspired" house.  It was built for Auburn S. Ainsworth, an attorney and realtor.  Mrs. Ainsworth "is best remembered as an eccentric lady who sponsored Christian Scientist meetings in her home for many years."

References

External links

Houses on the National Register of Historic Places in Montana
Houses completed in 1910
National Register of Historic Places in Sanders County, Montana
1910 establishments in Montana
Bungalow architecture in Montana
Thompson Falls, Montana